On Approval is a 1930 British comedy film directed by and starring Tom Walls and also featuring Yvonne Arnaud, Winifred Shotter and Robertson Hare, the same artistes responsible for the Aldwych farces. It was based on the play On Approval by Frederick Lonsdale, as was the 1944 film On Approval.

It was made at British and Dominion's Elstree Studios with sets designed by Lawrence P. Williams.

The 1932  book "The Face of London" by Harold Clunn Pub. Simpkin Marshall, features, opposite page 224, a picture, probably taken in Aug. or Sept. 1930, of the New Victoria Picture Theatre, Vauxhall Bridge Road. Displayed in large letters is ON APPROVAL the film being presented by the cinema at that time.

Cast
 Tom Walls as Duke of Bristol
 Yvonne Arnaud as Maria Wislak
 Winifred Shotter as Helen Hayle
 Edmund Breon as Richard Wemys
 Mary Brough as Emerald
 Robertson Hare as Hedworth

References

External links

1930 films
1930 comedy films
Films directed by Tom Walls
British comedy films
British films based on plays
British black-and-white films
British and Dominions Studios films
Films shot at Imperial Studios, Elstree
Films set in London
1930s English-language films
1930s British films